Giuseppe Avezzana was an Italian soldier and businessman. He fought in wars in Europe and the Americas.

Biography
Avezzana was born in Chieri, Italy, on February 19th of 1797. In 1812, him and his family moved to Turin, where his father, Lorenzo Molino, had set up a business. By the time he was 15, Giuseppe enlisted among the Hussars, and on June 15th of 1812 he enlisted as a volunteer for the 4th regiment of the Imperial Honor Guard of the French Army, which was heading for Strasbourg. The following year, in December, Avezzana had his leg fractured at Lorraine, and was forced to retreat to Milan.

Avezzana served under Napoleon I from 1813 until the fall of the First French Empire. Afterwards, he joined the Sardinian army. In 1815, he arrayed against his old leader, Napoleon I, who had made his escape from Elba. Avezzana was opposed to the restoration of Ferdinand VII to the Spanish throne in September 1823, fighting against it. For this he was captured and held as a prisoner for several weeks. After his release, he sailed to America.

In June 1827, he found himself called upon once again to defend the state of Tamaulipas against the Spaniards, who invaded the territory under General Barradas. Superior numbers almost lead him to retirement, although he soon managed to rally a force sufficiently strong to defend against the invaders.

In 1832, a revolution was organized by Antonio López de Santa Anna against the government of Anastasio Bustamante, and Avezzana was, as always, ready to lead the revolt. Left in command at Tampico by General Montezuma, who went to stir up the revolutionists elsewhere, he maneuvered so successfully with a small force that they captured three times their number of government troops at Ciudad Victoria, with artillery and supplies. From this time, he gave the enemy no rest, but retrieved the disasters that had befallen Santa Anna and Montezuma, and mainly through his able military leadership the liberal cause triumphed.

After resigning his command, in 1834 Avezzana went into business in New York City. He married an Irish lady and led a quiet mercantile life until the revolutions of 1848, when he promptly responded to the call of Italy. He was absent for a year, and only returned to America after he had fought the Austrians and Sardinians at Genoa. Him and his few thousand followers defended Rome for two months against the allied armies, numbering 100,000 soldiers. Once the rebels were crushed, he escaped to America and resumed his mercantile life in New York.

Memorials 
A street in Rome, Italy is named in honor of Giuseppe Avezzana.

Notes

References

1797 births
1879 deaths
People of the Revolutions of 1848
Italian soldiers
People from Chieri
Italian expatriates in the United States